Screams for Tina was an American death rock and gothic rock band formed in Los Angeles in 1985 by Warren Mansfield (vocals, bass, keyboards) and Marvin Rinnig (guitar).

History
The duo of Mansfield and Rinnig recorded a five-song 12-inch EP, Strobelight Funeral, released in 1986 on their own Dark Illusion Records label.

English bassist Billy Budd and local drummer Bobbi Drier joined in 1987, and the band became regular performers at LA clubs such as Scream, The Roxy and the Whisky a Go Go.

In 1988, L.A. Weekly  held a citywide Rock Music Awards poll, and Screams for Tina placed in the Top 5 of the Best New Band and Best Underground Band categories, as well as in the Top 10 for Independent Album.

In 1990, Rinning was replaced by Kent Bancroft (Like Wreckage, Spahn Ranch). They released the double-7" EP Judgement Day in 1992 on Piece Of Mind Records.

Cleopatra Records included the band's song "11:11" on the 1993 compilation album The Whip. This led to the release of their eponymous first full-length studio album that year by Cleopatra in the US and Talitha Records in Germany.

In 1998, the group disbanded but it reformed in 2002 as a duo of Mansfield and Budd, and signed to Austrian label Strobelight Records, releasing the four-song EP 2003 A.D. the next year.

Discography

Studio albums
Screams for Tina (1993, Cleopatra Records/Talitha Records)

EPs
Strobelight Funeral 12-inch (1986, Dark Illusion Records)
Judgement Day 7-inch (1992, Piece of Mind Records)
2003 A.D. CD (2003, Strobelight Records)

Compilation appearances
"11:11" on The Whip (1993, Cleopatra Records/Talitha Records)

References 

American dark wave musical groups
American gothic rock groups